Parliamentary elections were held in Greece on 3 May 1892. Supporters of Charilaos Trikoupis emerged as the largest bloc in Parliament, with 160 of the 207 seats. Trikoupis became Prime Minister for the sixth time on 22 June.

Results

References

Greece
Parliamentary elections in Greece
1892 in Greece
Greece
1890s in Greek politics
Charilaos Trikoupis